Irina Borodavko (born 4 November 1979) is a Kazakhstani water polo player. She competed in the women's tournament at the 2000 Summer Olympics.

See also
 List of women's Olympic water polo tournament goalkeepers

References

1979 births
Living people
Sportspeople from Almaty
Kazakhstani female water polo players
Water polo goalkeepers
Olympic water polo players of Kazakhstan
Water polo players at the 2000 Summer Olympics